Vanand is an abandoned village in the Goris Municipality of Syunik Province, Armenia. It is listed as unpopulated at the 2011 census.

References 

Former populated places in Syunik Province